Sunda Kelapa is the old port of Jakarta located on the estuarine of Ciliwung River. "Sunda Kalapa" (Sundanese: "Coconut of Sunda") is the original name, and it was the main port of the Sunda Kingdom. The port is situated in Penjaringan sub-district, of North Jakarta, Indonesia. Today the old port only accommodate pinisi, a traditional two masted wooden sailing ship serving inter-island freight service in the archipelago.  Although it is now only a minor port, Jakarta has its origins in Sunda Kelapa and it played a significant role in the city's development. The port is currently operated by the state-owned Indonesia Port Corporations.

History

Hindu-Buddhist period
The Chinese source, Zhu Fan Zhi, written circa 1200, Chou Ju-kua identified the two most powerful and richest kingdoms in the Indonesian archipelago as Sriwijaya and Java (Kediri). According to this source, in the early 13th Century, Sriwijaya still ruled Sumatra, the Malay peninsula, and western Java (Sunda). The source identifies the port as strategic and thriving, pepper from Sunda being among the best in quality. The people worked in agriculture and their houses were built on wooden poles (rumah panggung). However, robbers and thieves plagued the country. However it was uncertain which port of Sunda was referred to by Chou Ju-kua, it probably referred to the port of Banten, and not Kalapa.

From the 13th to 16th century Sunda Kelapa was the main port of Sunda Kingdom. The port served the capital, Pakuan Pajajaran, located about 60 km inland south, along the Ciliwung river hinterland, now the site of modern Bogor. The port thrived on the international spice trade especially pepper, the main spice produce of the Sunda kingdom. Sunda Kelapa, together with Aceh and Makassar, were one of the few Indonesian ports that maintained ties with Europe.

The Portuguese
 
By 1511, the Portuguese had conquered Malacca and established the earliest European colony in Southeast Asia. According to Suma Oriental, written in 1512–1515, Tomé Pires, a Portuguese explorer reported about the importance of the port of Calapa which corresponds to the port of Sunda Kalapa.

In 1522, the Portuguese secured a politics and economic agreement with the Hindu Kingdom of Sunda, the authority of the port. In exchange for military assistance against the threat of the rising Islamic Javan Sultanate of Demak, Prabu Surawisesa, king of Sunda at that time, granted them free access to the pepper trade. Portuguese who were in the service of the sovereign made their homes in Sunda Kelapa and were the first Christians in the lands of present day Indonesia.

However, in 1527, Fatahillah, on behalf of the Demak attacked the Portuguese in Sunda Kelapa and succeeded in conquering the harbour on 22 June 1527, after which Sunda Kelapa was renamed Jayakarta. Later, the port became a part of the Banten Sultanate.

The VOC

In 1619, Jan Pieterszoon Coen, an official working for the Dutch East India Company, seized the port of Jayakarta from the Sultanate of Banten and founded Batavia. During the early period of VOC, the port was mainly used by small ships which were able to sail into the canal and toward the Kali Besar, where goods were loaded and ships were repaired in shipyards i.e. the VOC and the Chinese shipyards located opposite of the Batavia Castle. Larger ships were difficult to enter the port due to its narrow width as well as the shallow water, so these had to anchor out at sea. 

By the late 17th-century maintenance of the port already prove to be very difficult. Sandbanks continuously building up at its mouth and around the area. A fortification called Waterkasteel was built in 1741 to provide protection to the harbour. In the 18th-century, for a short time the VOC made use of slaves and horses to tow dredges along the canal from its eastern bank. The strategy proved to be inefficient and caused loss of life, partly also because of the unsanitary condition and the heat of the tropical climate.

Modern colonialism
During the 19th-century, the port was known as the Haven Kanaal ("Harbor Canal"). Being the only entrance to Batavia, it earned the nickname "Roads of Batavia" or "Batavia's Roadstead". The port was still a narrow canaled harbor, so large vessels still had to anchor their ships further north. Smaller ships, known as "lighters", were used to transport cargo and passengers to the port. The lighters were described as a very small and very shallow iron steamship, which replaced the earlier large rowing boats. The condition of the Haven Kanaal during the period was deteriorating and performed below the accepted standards, which was similar with the condition of the Old Town at that time. The whole process of carrying passengers and cargo were time-consuming and could be dangerous during stormy weather. Accidents e.g. collision between ships with moored junks were recorded.

In 1885, the Netherlands East Indies government decided to build a new Tanjung Priok port to accommodate the increasing traffic as a result of the opening of the Suez Canal. The new port is located 9 kilometers to the east from the old port.

Post-independence
After the independence of the Republic of Indonesia, the Batavia old port was renamed back to its original name, Sunda Kelapa, as a tribute to the long history of the port as the cradle of Jakarta.

See also 
 Jakarta Old Town

Notes

Works cited

 Adolf Heuken SJ dan Grace Pamungkas, 2000, Galangan Kapal Batavia selama tiga ratus tahun. Jakarta:Cipta Loka Caraka/Sunda Kelapa Lestari  
 Jan Gonda, 1951, Sanskrit in Indonesia.  

 Supratikno Rahardjo et al., 1996, Sunda Kelapa sebagai Bandar di Jalur Sutra. Laporan Penelitian. Jakarta: Departemen Pendidikan dan Kebudayaan RI  
 Thomas B. Ataladjar dan Sudiyono, 1991, 'Sunda Kelapa' di Ensiklopedi Nasional Indonesia. Jakarta: Cipta Adi Pustaka

External links

 Menyusuri Kota Tua Jakarta, Pikiran Rakyat  
 Pelabuhan Sunda Kelapa yang Terabaikan 

Ports and harbours of Indonesia
Sunda Kingdom
Buildings and structures in Jakarta
Cultural Properties of Indonesia in Jakarta
North Jakarta